Ammannia multiflora, commonly known as many-flower ammannia and jerry-jerry in Victoria, is a species in the family Lythraceae. It is widespread in Asia, tropical and sub-tropical Africa and Australia. It can be found in shallow water and damp heavy soils.

Description 
Ammannia multiflora is an erect, branched herb which grows to a height of about 60 cm. The leaves are opposite, and without stalks (sessile). The leaf blade is oblong-linear to narrowly lanceolate or oblanceolate, and from 0.5 to 5 cm long, with a heart-shaped base. The inflorescences occur in short dense clusters. The sepals are triangular and about. 0.2 mm long, with the petals being about 0.5 to 1 mm long. There are 4 stamens. The capsule is globular and from 1.5 to 2.5 mm in diameter.

Distribution 
In Australia, it is found in Western Australia, the Northern Territory, South Australia, Queensland, New South Wales, and Victoria.

Conservation status
While its conservation status under the IUCN redlist is of "least concern", in Victoria it is considered "vulnerable".

Uses 
In Australia, Aborigenes ground its seed and baked the resultant meal to make cakes.

Gallery

References

External links
Ammannia multiflora occurrence data from GBIF
Ammannia multiflora Australian occurrence data from AVH

multiflora
Plants described in 1820
Taxa named by William Roxburgh